Seán O'Hegarty (21 March 1881 – 31 May 1963) was a prominent member of the Irish Republican Army in County Cork during the Irish War of Independence. He served as O/C of the Cork No. 1 Brigade of the IRA after the deaths of Tomás Mac Curtain and Terence MacSwiney.

Biography

Early life
Born in Cork on 21 March 1881, O'Hegarty came from a family with strong nationalist roots. His parents were John, a plasterer and stucco worker and Katherine (née Hallahan) Hegarty. His elder brother was Patrick Sarsfield O'Hegarty, the writer.

His parents' families emigrated to the United States after the Great famine, and his parents married in Boston.  His father was a member of the IRB. In 1888 his father died of tuberculosis, aged 42, and his mother had to work to support the family.

Entering Irish Nationalism
O'Hegarty was educated at the CBS North Monastery school in Cork.  By 1902, he had left school to work as a sorter in the local post office, rising to post office clerk. He was a supporter of the Irish language, music, and Gaelic games. A committed sportsman, in his twenties he was captain of the Post Office HQ's hurling team. He followed his brother Patrick (P. S. O'Hegarty) into the Gaelic League and eventually the Irish Volunteers and the Irish Republican Brotherhood. He was a member of the Celtic Literary Society by 1905 and founded the Growney branch of the Gaelic League in 1907.  A puritanical character by nature, he was a non-smoker and never drank.

O'Hegarty was a founder of the local branch of the Irish Volunteers in Cork in December 1913.  In June of the following year he was appointed to the Cork section of the Volunteer Executive, and then to the Military Council.  In October the Dublin government discovered his illegal activities, so he was dismissed.  Excluded from Cork under the DORA regulations, he moved to Ballingeary, where he worked as a labourer.  From there he moved to Enniscorthy, County Wexford, where he lived with Larry de Lacy.  On 24 February 1915, he was arrested and tried under the Defence of the Realm Act for putting up seditious posters.  But for this and a second charge of 'possession of explosives' he was discharged.  The explosives belonged to de Lacy.

The Volunteers appointed O'Hegarty as Commandant of Ballingeary and Bandon.  During the Easter Rising O'Hegarty was stationed in Ballingeary when visited by Michael McCarthy of Dunmanway to propose an attack on an RIC post at Macroom.  But their strength was fatally weakened, and having no reserves they called off the attempt. In 1917, he became Vice-commandant of no.1 Cork Brigade.  He worked as a store-keeper at the workhouse but was intimidating, and clashed with the Poor Law Guardians.

War of Independence
During the War of Independence, O'Hegarty was one of the most active in County Cork.  Like others, he was exasperated with Tomas Mac Curtain's inactivity, and refusal to be more bellicose.  One such was battalion commander, Richard Langford, who joined with O'Hegarty's unit to make an unauthorized raid on the RIC post at Macroom.  Langford was court-martialed, but O'Hegarty continued to rise in the ranks.  They had plundered 50 modern rifles and ammunition, much needed by a unit starved of supplies.  When a RIC Inspector was murdered, Mac Curtain condemned the shootings and called for their end.  On 19 March 1920, Mac Curtain was shot and killed in his own home in Cork.  The coroner blamed the British establishment in Dublin, but the police never made any attempt to investigate the killings.  Shortly after these events General Tudor began the policy of Official Reprisals.

In January 1920, an inquiry was held into corruption alleged against "Hegarty's Mob" or "Hegarty's Crowd" running Cork City.  He blamed the former mayors for the charges of incompetence, but remained on good terms with them.

In a raid on Cork City Hall on 12 August 1920, the British managed to net all the top brass of the IRA in Cork.  In an incredible failure of intelligence they did not identify the leadership as their prisoners.  They were all released, including Liam Lynch, and O'Hegarty.  Only Terence MacSwiney, the new Lord Mayor, was kept in custody and sent to England.

On 25 February 1921 the Coolavokig Ambush was carried out by the 1st Cork Brigade under O'Hegarty at Ballyvourney village (on the road between Macroom and Ballyvourney). The IRA suffered no casualties. However, the number of British casualties has been disputed to this day.

The brigade commanders in the southern division retained a residual lingering resentment of Dublin GHQ's lack of leadership and supplies.  Sean Moylan, commandant of No.2 Cork bde, thought good communications with No.1 bde were to be vital; but little of this was seen via the organizer Ernie O'Malley at GHQ.  At a meeting set up for 26 April 1921, when the manual of Infantry Training 1914 was produced it, the document, raised great anger.  The meeting ended in uproar, when O'Hegarty who was "a master of invective, tore the communication and its authors to ribbons".

O'Malley and Liam Lynch, the general, met with O'Hegarty in the mountains of West Cork, near a deserted farmhouse, just off the main road.  In On Another Man's Wound O'Hegarty is described as wearing "a light-blue swallow-tail coat, and trousers, a heavy woollen coat, derby hat, with a twisted stick under his arm...he was bearded, mutton-chop whiskers." In the retreat that followed, the Irish lost heavy casualties, and left their wounded to the good care of the British.  These were the "Round-ups" in which the Irish slept outside in order to avoid being at home when the Army called.  They were told by Brigade to learn the English National Anthem to avoid arrest.

In East Cork brigade O'Hegarty uncovered a spy ring.  He was ruthless in the treatment of Mrs Georgina Lindsay and her chauffeur who gave away information to the Catholic clergy, but remarkably lenient on brigade traitors within.  He was allegedly not too bothered about evidence; but was reminded that all executions of a traitor had to be approved by Dublin first.

O'Hegarty became more and more aggressive towards the establishment, using tough language to impose his will over the area.  He attempted to force the civilian TD's for Cork to stand down, to give way to military candidates, telling the Dáil in December 1921, that any TD voting for the treaty would be guilty of treason.  But De Valera was decided, and overruled any interference with the Civil Government.  Like the commanders De Valera rejected the treaty, but had already been defeated in the Dáil on a vote by Cosgrave's majority.

On 1 February 1922, O'Hegarty married Maghdalen Ni Laoghaire (d.1940), who was a prominent member of Cumann na mBan.

During the Civil War
O'Hegarty was on the IRA's Executive Council, but when there was a meeting on 9 April 1922, it was proposed that the Army should oppose the elections by force: as a result Florence O'Donoghue, and Tom Hales joined O'Hegarty in resigning. In May, Hegarty and Dan Breen entered into negotiations with Free Stater Dick Mulcahy. A statement was published in the Press asking for unity and acceptance of the Treaty.  During this time the republicans became very demoralized and ill-disciplined.  But they had to gain strength before announcing independence from Dublin.  The debate amongst the anti-treaty IRA command was increasingly rancorous.

The bitter divisions split the anti-treatyites into two camps.  Two motions were debated at the Army Convention on 18 June 1922. At first the motion to oppose the treaty by force was passed.  These men included Tom Barry, Liam Mellows, and Rory O'Connor, who were all in favour of continuing the fight until the British were driven out of Ireland altogether.  But one brigade's votes had to be recounted, and then the motion was narrowly defeated.  Joe McKelvey was appointed the new chief of staff, but the IRA was in chaos.  While he strongly opposed the Anglo-Irish Treaty, O'Hegarty took a neutral role in the Irish Civil War and tried to avert hostilities breaking out into full-scale civil war. He emerged as a leader of the 'Neutral IRA' with O'Donoghue. This was a 'loose' confederation of 20,000 men who had taken part in the pre-truce wars, but had remained neutral during the Civil War from January 1923.  Over 150 persons attended its convention in Dublin on 4 February 1923. By April 1923, O'Malley was imprisoned in Mountjoy Jail.  In a letter to Jim Donovan (Seamus O'Donovan) on 7 April he blamed Hegarty for all this compromise and "peace talk".

Alleged involvement in the death of Michael Collins
It has been alleged by the author Gerard Murphy that Hegarty had a  role in the assassination of the Commander in Chief, Michael Collins in August 192,. along with Florrie O'Donoghue and Joe O'Connor. It is alleged that as members of the 1st Southern Division Cork they were actually feigning claims of neutrality but remained part of the IRB in order to set up talks towards peace and the cessation of hostilities at the start of the Irish Civil War.

Catholicism
Although probably an atheist during the War of Independence, he returned later in life to the Catholic church.  On forming the Neutral Group of the IRA in December 1922, he tried to unify differences in the volunteers between Republicans and the Free Staters.  He communicated with the Papal Nuncio during the inter-war years in an attempt to have Bishop Cohalan's excommunication bull lifted.  Instead he turned to commemoration as a way to earn favour in Rome, with the dedication of a catholic church in Finnbarr's cemetery.  After his wife's passing he became a close friend with Florence O'Donoghue until his own death. 

He died on 31 May 1963 at Bon Secours Hospital, Cork.

References

Bibliography

Primary and Secondary Sources
 Barry, Tom, Guerilla Days in Ireland (Dublin 1949, Tralee 1962)
 Barry, Tom, The Reality of the Anglo-Irish War 1920-1 in West Cork (Tralee 1974)
 Borgonovo, John (ed.), Florence and Josephine O'Donoghue's War of Independence. A Destiny that Shapes our Ends (Dublin 2006)
 Girvin, Kevin, Seán O'Hegarty: O/C First Cork Brigade, Irish Republican Army Aubane Historical Society, .
 Hart, Peter, IRA and its enemies: Violence and Community in Cork (Oxford 1998)
 Hart, Peter, The IRA at War 1916-1923 (Oxford 2003)
 Laffan, Michael, The Partition of Ireland 1911-1925 (Dublin 1983)
 Lynch, Diarmuid, The IRB and the 1916 Insurrection (Cork 1957)
 Maguire, Gloria, 'The Political and Military Causes of the Division in the Irish Nationalist Movement, January 1921 to August 1923', DPhil thesis, Oxford University 1983.
 Murphy, Gerard, The Year of Disappearances: Political Killings in Cork 1921-1922 (Dublin 2010)
 O'Donoghue, Florence, No Other Law (Dublin 1954, 1986)
 O'Malley, Ernie, The Singing Flame (Dublin 1978)
 Ruiseal, Liam, 'The Position in Cork', Capuchin Annual (1966), p. 377-80.
 O'Brien, R Barry, Munster at War (Cork 1971).

External links
 Seán O’Hegarty biography Irish Democrat

1881 births
1963 deaths
Irish Republican Army (1919–1922) members
Members of the Irish Republican Brotherhood
People from County Cork